Exmouth Submarine Base, called Operation  Potshot, was a United States Navy base at Exmouth Gulf, Western Australia during World War II. Exmouth Gulf on western Australia was selected as the site for US Naval base as it was thought at the time to be out of the reach of Empire of Japan's long-range bombers. Bombing of Darwin on February 19, 1942, demonstrated a more southern port was needed. The Submarine operation at Exmouth Gulf and the North West Cape was called Operation Potshot, named after the Potshot airfield that provided fighter plane cover for the base.

History   
With the loss of Naval Base Manila in the Philippines, US Submarines fled to Dutch East Indies and then Indonesia until these ports were taken over. This forced the US Submarine Fleet to Australian ports out of bomber range. A Submarine Base was set up in Exmouth Gulf. To support the submarines, submarine tender USS Pelias was stationed at Exmouth Gulf at Exmouth, Western Australia. A 500-ton Type B barges was stationed at the base to refuel the subs. Oil tankers would refill the barge as needed. A rest camp for the crew was set up at the base. Potshot airfield, near Yanrey, was also called Learmonth Airport of the Royal Australian Air Force. For added defense, a British GLll radar station was installed. The base had Australian 3 inch anti-aircraft guns and QF 3.7-inch anti-aircraft guns installed. The US installed Bofors gun anti-aircraft guns. A US Naval Naval Communication Station was built at the site. While it was thought that Exmouth Gulf was far enough south to be out of range for an attack, on May 20 and 21, 1943 that base was attacked. So the base was moved to Fremantle Submarine Base. Charles A. Lockwood was overseeing the bases at Fremantle and Exmouth. Exmouth Gulf was too north for a base, as it was hit by cyclones. Exmouth was used as part of the staging for Operation Transom in May 1944.

1943 raids
On May 20, 1943, two Japanese Betty bombers were first spotted by the Radar Station at Onslow, just north of Exmouth Gulf. Then spotted by the Radar Station at Exmouth Gulf. At about 10.55 pm the Japanese planes bomb Exmouth Gulf but hit nothing. Two Royal Australian Air Force CAC Boomerang planes of the No. 85 Squadron RAAF tried to intercept the bombers, but did not find them. On May 21, 1943, again the two radar stations spotted two Japanese aircraft. The two planes dropped nine bombs into the Exmouth Gulf at about midnight, again hitting nothing. Again two Boomerang were sent up, but by the time one plane found a bomber, it was low on fuel and had to return to base. Other raids hit close to Radar Station at Exmouth Gulf.
On 15 May 1943, Onslow was bombed by Japan when a single bomber, bombed the Onslow airfield with no damage done.

Seaplane Base Exmouth

The US Navy set up a Seaplane Base at Exmouth Gulf, called Advance Base D  that operated two squadrons of Consolidated PBY Catalina flying boats. US Navy Patrol Bombing Squadron VPB-33 and VPB-52 operated out of the base. The planes were serviced by the USS Childs, a destroyer that became a seaplane tender. The Double Sunrise airline service also operated from the base. The PBY Catalina did search, combat, rescue, and reconnaissance patrols. On November 26, 1942, PBY-5A # 2407 aborted a take-off at Exmouth, the plane hit a large swell. The front bombing window broke and water poured in. The plane sank in 18 feet, the captain was killed and eight other were injured. On April 28, 1943, a PBY crash at Exmouth, killing 3 in the plane.  On July 3, 1943, PBY #08294 crashed in Exmouth Gulf, killing 4 crew members and 8 passengers. The plane was not repairable.

Z Special Unit

Exmouth Submarine Base, code name Potshot, was used as a staging base for Z Special Unit. Z Special Unit was special forces use made up of British, Australian, Dutch, New Zealand, Timorese and Indonesian and a few American troops that operate in Southeast Asia behind Japanese lines. The operation was mostly for reconnaissance and sabotage work. From Potshot Z Special Unit started  Operation Jaywick, a successful raid on Japanese shipping in Singapore Harbour, in September 1943.
Operation Reinau also used the base for staging, the operation was unsuccessful, with all team members were killed as Japanese found them before the raid. Six Z Special crew members killed have streets in Exmouth named after them.

Post war
Operation Potshot Memorial Plaque was built in 1963 near the Potshot reconnaissance site.

See also

US Naval Advance Bases
Naval Base Perth
Roebuck Bay Seaplane Base
US Naval Base Australia

References

External links
youtube World War 2 - Defence of Australia

Military installations established in 1942
Closed installations of the United States Navy
1942 in Australia
South West Pacific theatre of World War II
Western Australia during World War II